Eliza Fraser Morrison, Lady Mitchell was a Melbourne based charity worker, Red Cross administrator, and an autobiographer. Morrison was well known for her voluntary work in Australia. 

Eliza Fraser Morrison was born on 30 March 1864 at Melbourne, Victoria, Australia to Alexander Morrison and Christina, née Fraser. She was educated at home and later at Presbyterian Ladies' College, Melbourne. Morrison was involved with the Red Cross Society in Victoria, the Victoria League,  Queen Victoria Hospital in Melbourne, the New Settlers’ League of Victoria, the Country Women’s Association, and the Victorian Bush Nursing Association.

Works
 Three-quarters of a century, 1940

References 

1864 births
1948 deaths
Red Cross personnel
Writers from Melbourne
Australian autobiographers
19th-century Australian women
20th-century Australian women
People educated at the Presbyterian Ladies' College, Melbourne